The Highland Chieftain is a named British passenger train operated by London North Eastern Railway. It operates daily in each direction between London King's Cross and Inverness via the East Coast and Highland Main Line. It is one of the longest train journeys in the United Kingdom at 581 miles with a journey time of eight hours.

History
Historically, the principal train service between London and the Scottish Highlands was The Clansman, which ran via the West Coast Main Line.

The Highland Chieftain was introduced with the May 1984 timetable on the East Coast Main Line and was intended to replace The Clansman; the running time then was 8 hours 40 minutes southbound and 8 hours 50 minutes northbound. Today, it has a journey time of eight hours. Originally operated by InterCity 125 sets, the service has been operated by Class 800 Azumas since December 2019.

Electric locomotive 87023, which operated on the West Coast Main Line, was named Highland Chieftain between 1978 and 1984, but never had an association with the passenger service. LNER High Speed Train power car 43308, which has operated the service, was later named Highland Chieftain. The nameplate was auctioned by London North Eastern Railway in 2020.

References

External links
National Rail Enquiries website - main web portal for UK train fares, times and other travel information

Named passenger trains of British Rail
East Coast Main Line
Railway services introduced in 1984
1984 establishments in the United Kingdom